Dilator or dilatator is a medical term with a number of uses, including:

A surgical instrument or medical implement used to induce dilation, that is, to expand an opening or passage such as the cervix (see cervical dilator), urethra, esophagus, or vaginal introitus.
A pharmacological treatment used to induce dilation, such as cervical dilation, vasodilation, or pupillary dilation. For example, a bronchodilator.
A muscle which causes dilation of a part, for example, the iris dilator muscle or the dilator naris muscle.

See also

Stent
Vaginal dilator

Medical equipment